Unleash may refer to:

 Unleash (EP), a Band-Maid EP
 "Unleash" (song), a Soulfly song
 Unleash Award, a Dutch literary award

See also  
 Unleashed (disambiguation)